Barbara Aileen Wagner (born May 5, 1938) is a Canadian former pair skater. She teamed up with Robert Paul in 1952. They became the 1960 Olympic champions, four-time World champions, and five-time Canadian national champions. After retiring from competition, the pair toured with Ice Capades.

Wagner was formerly married to U.S. figure skater James Grogan. She resides in Alpharetta, Georgia, coaching figure skating at the Alpharetta Family Skate Center, the Cooler, and is a member of the Atlanta Figure Skating Club.

Results
(with Paul)

References

Canadian female pair skaters
1938 births
Living people
Lou Marsh Trophy winners
Olympic figure skaters of Canada
Figure skaters at the 1956 Winter Olympics
Figure skaters at the 1960 Winter Olympics
Olympic gold medalists for Canada
Figure skaters from Toronto
Olympic medalists in figure skating
World Figure Skating Championships medalists
Medalists at the 1960 Winter Olympics